Bob Giraldi (born January 17, 1939) is an American film and television director, educator, and restaurateur. He is known for directing the film Dinner Rush (2000) and the music video for Michael Jackson's Beat It (1983). Giraldi has been inducted into the Art Director’s Hall of Fame, one of the few film directors to be honored; and, in 2014, was the first director ever to be inducted to the Advertising Hall of Fame. His work has garnered several London International Awards, Cannes Advertising Awards, NY International Awards, Addy Awards, Chicago Film Festival Awards, and dozens of Clio Awards. He has been named one of the 101 Stars Behind 100 Years of Advertising.

Early life 
Giraldi was born on January 17, 1939, in Paterson, New Jersey, to a working-class Italian-American family. He attended Eastside High School. Giraldi attended Pratt Institute in Brooklyn, graduating with a Bachelor of Fine Arts degree in 1960. He was a student of Herschel Levit.

In 1960, he worked as a graphic designer at General Motors in Detroit, then spent the next nine years as an art director and creative supervisor at the advertising agency Young & Rubicam and Della Femina & Partners.

In 1965, teaching advertising at The School of Visual Arts in New York he became the chair of the Advertising Department. In 1968, President Silas Rhodes appointed him the Assistant Director of the school. During the Vietnam War, Giraldi stepped down and remained on the school's board of directors, and today is the chair of the Masters in Director’s Program. Then in 1981 he directed and produced a film "Burnt Umber", a recruitment film featuring a then-unknown actor Denzel Washington for SVA's recruitment program.

In 1970, Giraldi left his career at the advertising agency DellaFemina & Partners to form his production company Giraldi Productions, which has produced and directed close to 5,000 commercials, music videos and short films.

Career

Advertising
Bob Giraldi has produced and directed over 5,000 unique visual marketing and advertising pieces.

Directing his first commercials at the ad agency Della Femina in the late 1960s before moving on to form his own company with Phil Suarez in the 1970s, Giraldi has had success as a commercial director over the years, picking up numerous awards along the way.

Although there have been several feature and short films, music videos, and restaurants to distract Giraldi from his commercial work down the years, he has never strayed far from the medium and the business that he owes it all to. Still working and producing fine work to this day, Giraldi runs his own production company, Giraldi Media, out of New York and Los Angeles, with a network of other commercial directors connected through the company.

Music videos
His narrative and musical storytelling abilities were first seen in Michael Jackson's Beat It (1983) music video, as the video swept the country and won numerous awards including that year's American Music Award, the Billboard Music Award and the People’s Choice Award. Originally the Beat It video was to be directed by Steve Barron, however his theme for the video was rejected. Giraldi was hand-picked by Jackson himself after the singer saw an Eye Witness News commercial directed by Giraldi, about an elderly blind couple holding a block party for their new Black and Hispanic neighbors, the Beat It video featured cast members that were real life members of the Bloods and the Crips.

Next up was making the first music video to ever feature dialogue, as Giraldi directed Pat Benatar's "Love is a Battlefield" soon after, before directing Lionel Richie's "Hello." He directed Michael Jackson again, this time with Paul McCartney for their song, Say Say Say. He continued to win acclaim and define the future of the medium, working with musicians such as Stevie Wonder, Diana Ross, Ricky Martin, Hall & Oates, Will Smith, Barry Manilow, and Patti LaBelle.

Films
Giraldi made three feature films in the 1980s, directing Jon Cryer's Hiding Out (1987), as well as National Lampoon's Movie Madness (1983) and Club Med (1985), before directing his fourth, and most critically acclaimed feature film, Dinner Rush a decade later.

Dinner Rush (2000), with Danny Aiello, John Corbett and Sandra Bernhard, was filmed at the Tribeca restaurant Gigino which is partially owned by Giraldi. The film appeared on a number of 2001's 'Top 10 Lists' and was selected for the 'New Directors/New Films Series' at MoMA. Dinner Rush was also listed by Roger Ebert as "One of the Best 100 Films in the Last 10 Years."

Giraldi's short film, The Routine, premiered at Sundance, won Best Drama at the Los Angeles International Short Film Festival, and is in the MoMA's permanent collection. Another short, My Hometown, is in the Baseball Hall of Fame's permanent collection and two short films; Dream Begins and A Peculiar City, both integral parts of New York’s national Olympic bid, are now part of MoMA's permanent collection.

His 2008 film Second Guessing Grandma with Kathleen Chalfant, examining the coming out of a twenty-something to his 83 year-old grandmother received the 'Jury Award' for 'Short Narrative at the 27th Annual Chicago International Film Festival' and won the 'Audience Award for Best Short' at the Fresno Reel Pride Festival. It was also selected to be in the new 'Google YouTube Screening Room', after it was the #3 most viewed video of the 2008 holiday season.

Giraldi directed the short film; A Poet Long Ago (2014), based on a short story written by Pete Hamill and starring Steve Schirripa, and Boris McGiver.  A Conversational Place (2015), with Emmy winner Marilyn Sokol, New Year's Eve @ Sunny's (2016), Superfriends (2017), and The Whisperer (2018) are all currently making the rounds in several film festivals across the globe.

Culinary
Giraldi has been a partial owner of many noted restaurants in New York City including Positano, European Union, Patria (opened 1994), Jo–Jo , Vong, Mercer Kitchen, Butcher Bay (opened 2009), BREADTribeca (opened 2003), Prime (in Las Vegas), Vongerichten (opened 1999), Jean Georges (opened 1997), and Gigino (opened 1994). Working alongside executive chefs such as Jean-Georges Vongerichten, Douglas Rodriquez, Luigi Celentano, Jason Hennings, and others.

It started in the 1990s, Bob Giraldi with his then film partner, Phil Suarez, and the fresh to New York City chef, Jean-Georges Vongerichten opened the New York City restaurant, Jo-Jo. Jo-Jo was a new business model for Vongerichten offering French cuisine at affordable prices.

In 1995, Giraldi and Executive Producer, Patti Greaney, created the original website StarChefs.com, featuring celebrity chefs and cookbook authors.

Giraldi appeared on the TV series, Celebrity Taste Makers, with Danny Aiello, discussing his experience in the restaurant business, as well as the making of Dinner Rush which has, over the years, earned its reputation as the original inspiration for the galaxy of food shows, both reality and fictional, that crowd the media landscape of today.

References

External links
Official website

Art Directors Club biography, portrait and images of work
MPS LIve Action Short Film program at SVA

American television directors
American music video directors
American people of Italian descent
1939 births
Living people
Eastside High School (Paterson, New Jersey) alumni
Film directors from New Jersey
People from Paterson, New Jersey
Pratt Institute alumni
Television commercial directors